The Bridestones is a chambered cairn, near Congleton, Cheshire, England, that was constructed in the Neolithic period about 3500–2400 BC. The cairn originally had a stone circle surrounding it, with four portal stones; two of these portal stones still remain. The site is protected as a scheduled ancient monument.

Condition in 18th century 
The state of the site was recorded in the second edition of Henry Rowlands's Mona Antiqua Restaurata (published in 1766), based on a report by Rev. Thomas Malbon, rector of Congleton. As the report describes removal of stones for road-building in 1764 (the Ashbourne–Leek–Congleton Turnpike, now Dial Lane, just south of the site), it appears that it was included by Henry Owen, editor of the second edition, and was not part of Rowlands's original 1723 edition. The report provides a detailed description of the site at the time along with a plate giving a plan of the site.

Folklore and naming
The origin of the cairn's name is unclear. One legend says that a recently married couple were murdered at the location, and the stones were laid around their grave. Another possibility is that they are named after Brigantia. Alternatively, the Old English word for "birds" was "briddes"; the stones in their original form could have resembled birds, giving rise to "Briddes stones".

Subsequent destruction 

The largest single ransacking of the monument was the removal of several hundred tons to construct the nearby turnpike road. Stones from the monument were also taken to build the nearby house and farm; other stones were used in an ornamental garden in Tunstall Park. The holed stone was broken some time before 1854; the top half was found replaced in 1877 but was gone again by 1935.

While the southern side of the main chamber was originally a single, it was split in 1843 by a picknicker's bonfire. Of the portal stones, only two remain, one of which is broken and concreted back together. This was reputedly caused by an engineer from the Manchester Ship Canal, who used the stone to demonstrate a detonator.

Excavations of the site were done by Professor Fleur of Manchester University in 1936 and 1937, with the aim of restoring the site as much as possible to its former condition.

See also

Scheduled Monuments in Cheshire (pre-1066)

References

Sources

External links 

 

Stone Age sites in England
Megalithic monuments in England
Buildings and structures in Cheshire
Archaeological sites in Cheshire
History of Cheshire
Tourist attractions in Cheshire
Scheduled monuments in Cheshire